Lataran (also Romanized as Lāţarān) is a village in the Central District of Sareyn County, Ardabil Province, Iran. At the 2006 census, its population was 168 in 35 families.

References 

Towns and villages in Sareyn County